Canaan Creative, known simply as Canaan, is a China-based computer hardware manufacturer. Established in 2013 by N.G. Zhang, Canaan specializes in Blockchain servers and ASIC microprocessors for use in bitcoin mining.

History
In 2013, during studying for a doctor's degree, N.G. Zhang established Canaan Creative, where he served as the chairman and CEO.

In 2016, Canaan attempted a reverse takeover for $466 Millions USD by Shandong Luyitong, a public company listed on the Shenzhen Stock Exchange.

In January 2019, reports surfaced that Canaan is considering an IPO in the United States. Canaan raised $90 million in their November 2019 IPO.

In 2019, Canaan was listed on Nasdaq.

References

External links
 

Open hardware organizations and companies
Internet properties established in 2013
Computer companies established in 2013
Chinese companies established in 2013
Manufacturing companies based in Beijing
Networking hardware companies
Bitcoin
Blockchain entities
2019 initial public offerings
Companies listed on the Nasdaq